Kim Hee-jin (born 17 June 1995) is a South Korean handball player for Incheon City and the South Korean national team.

She participated at the 2017 World Women's Handball Championship.

References

1995 births
Living people
South Korean female handball players